Lift&Oil was a Thai duo famous and popular in the 1990s under RS Promotion. The duo consists of "Lift" Supoj Chanjareon and "Oil" Thana Suttikamol. Their albums Lift&Oil and ZOO-A-HA each sold over a million copies.

History
They started as popular models in teenager magazines during the same period as Boyscout, Sornram Teppitak, Somchai Khemglad, etc.

Lift's original nick name is Dong. He is from Lamphun while Oil is from Ratchaburi and Nakhonratchasima. They had challenge from RS Label to make the relationship work.

Next time, they decided to rent the apartment in BKK in this apartment had 10 person lived in this apartment, 
and 1 person as James-Ruangsak Loychusak, James as famous star in continue time.

They debuted in 1994 in the name Lift&Oil first time in RS Meeting Concert 1994 Book Kaow Olaveng Rongpleang Nabann (Th:บุกเกาะอลเวงร้องเพลงหน้าบาน) and they made a chart in album Lift&Oil and ZOO-A-HA break out with sales exceeded a million caches.

And they had keep look with twin of short T-shirt (Lift&Oil's First Album) and mad color of T-shirt (ZOO-A-HA). Beside Two they had long hair since 1991-1996.

Until Oil 1 member had been draft in 1998 Lift&Oil had been stop. They returned in 2001 album Play Boys but unsuccessed as same as first two albums. 
In 2003 they had last album Der-Taa-2 and break up the duo band.

They reunion in 2011 with Raptor, as the guest for Raptor's concert. And 2012 they have big their concert Lift&Oil Happy Party concert and have concert until present.

Members
Lift- (ลิฟท์ : สุพจน์ จันทร์เจริญ) 
Oil– (ออย : ธนา สุทธิกมล)

Discography

Studio albums
Lift&Oil (ลิฟท์กับออย) 1994
Lift&Oil Sanam Dek Ten (Lift&Oil Dance Ground) (ลิฟท์กับออย สนามเด็กเต้น) 1995
ZOO-A-HA 1997
Play Boys 2001
Der-Taa-2 2003

Compilation albums
superteens 1996
The Next 1997
Lift&Oil Earthquakes 1997
Lift&Oil Funtasy 1998
The Celebration 2001
Ost.Can Lum Khong (แคนลำโขง) 2005

Concert
 Rom Bor Join Oil & Lift (TH:รมณ์บ่จอย ออยกับลิฟท์) (24 Dec 1994) MBK Hall
 Lift & Oil Bumpping Concert (28 Jan 1995) MBK Hall
 Lift & Oil Concert Pert Sanam Dek Ten (TH:เปิดสนามเด็กเต้น) (29 July 1995) Fashion Island
 Zoo A-Ha Zoo Zaa Concert (31 May 1997) MBK Hall
 Zoo A-Ha Double Zaa Thank you concert (30 Aug 1997) MCC Hall 
 Lift&Oil Happy Party concert (14 July 2012) Impact Arena

Jam Concert
 RS. Meeting Concert Book Kaow Olaveng Rongpleang Nabann (Th:บุกเกาะอลเวงร้องเพลงหน้าบาน) (22 Oct 1994) MBK Hall
 RS. Meeting Concert Nok Krueng Bab Zaa (TH:นอกเครื่องแบบ...ซ่า) (7 Oct 1995) MBK Hall
 RS. Freshy Jam Concert (11 Sep 1995) Thai Army Sports Stadium 
 Super Teen Super Concert (17 Feb 1996) Hua Mark Indoor Stadium
 RS. Meeting Concert Tam Ra Beab Ten (TH:ตามระเบียบ...เต้น) (2 Feb 1997) MBK Hall
 Pepsi The Next Generation Concert (18 Jan 1998) MBK Hall
 The Celebration Concert (10 Feb 2001) Hua Mark Indoor Stadium
 RS. Meeting Concert Star Mission Mun Lood Lok (TH:มันหลุดโลก) (22 Dec 2001) Hua Mark Indoor Stadium
 RS. Meeting Concert Super Surprise Trilogy (26 Apr 2003) Impact Arena
 RS. Meeting Concert Return 2013 (18-19 May 2013) Impact Arena
 The Next Venture Concert 2016 ( 6 Mar 2016) Impact Arena
 RS. Meeting Concert Dance Marathon (TH: ปลายปี...ถึงทีเต้น) (17 December 2022) Impact Arena
 RS HITS JOURNEY CONCERT 2023 (TH: ต้นปี..ถึงทีฮิต) (27 May 2023) Impact Arena

Filmography
A Miracle of Oam+Somwung (ปาฏิหาริย์โอม+สมหวัง) 1998

Series
Soo Fun Tabun Kang (สู่ฝันตะบันแข้ง) 2002
Can Lum Khong (แคนลำโขง) 2005
Din Nhur Thong (ดินเนื้อทอง) 2008
Keaw Klang Dong (แก้วกลางดง) 2012
Tewada Fun Namnom (เทวดาฟันน้ำนม) 2015
Jha Rueng Sueng Yub (จ่าเริงเซิ้งยับ) 2016-2017

TV Talk Show 
 Hong Rub Khak Rom Bor Join

References 

 - a day เล่มนี้ ได้ใจ ไปเต็มๆ เลย กับหน้าปกศิลปิน เก่าๆ RS ใครเป็นใคร แค่จำประโยดเพลงเด็ดๆ ได้ ก็แว่ะเข้ามาคร่า

1994 establishments in Thailand
2003 disestablishments in Thailand
Thai pop music groups
Thai musical duos
Musical groups from Bangkok